Monticello (Gaming and)  Raceway is open but a harness racing track only again , the racino closed and  moved 6 miles away in 2018 called RW Catskills in Monticello, New York, Sullivan County, New York. The raceway was possibly the first “racino” allowed in New York . Just Harness racing continues now.  It is off Exit 104 of Route 17 (future Interstate 86), on New York State Route 17B.

The racetrack is nicknamed "The Mighty M" and races standardbred horse races during the afternoons year-round.  The current racetrack is a 1/2 mile oval. The track opened on June 27, 1958 in order to attract more people to Monticello's resort area.

Monticello Raceway is owned by Empire Resorts.

There had been attempts since 2000 to add a full-fledged Indian gaming casino operated by the St. Regis Mohawk tribe at the raceway, but they were met with backlash. Several Atlantic City casino operators, including Donald Trump, fought the proposal. Trump was fined for not disclosing his lobbying efforts.  In January 2008, Dirk Kempthorne, Secretary of the United States Department of the Interior vetoed any Mohawk plans for a casino saying the Mohawk reservation on the Canada–United States border was too far from the track. The casino at the raceway operated under a state license permitting slot machines at designated race tracks.

In 2006, the track was the site of the so-called "Monticello Miracle", in which a racehorse hit World War II veteran Don Karkos in the exact spot where he had received shrapnel and lost sight in one of his eyes during a World War II naval battle aboard . This blow caused him to regain his sight, most likely by dislodging the shrapnel.

Eventually, in February 2018, a full casino called Resorts World Catskills was opened nearby, also owned by the same parent company of Monticello Raceway. In April 2019, the slots and racino part of Monticello Raceway were closed for good, though racing continues as of 2022 year-round during the day, Mondays through Thursdays and on some Fridays. There is a small OTB facility in a portion of the old racino/grandstands and an even smaller outdoor betting trailer with 1 or 2 mutuel tellers.

References

External links

VLT info

Horse racing venues in New York (state)
Harness racing venues in the United States
Sports venues in Sullivan County, New York
1958 establishments in New York (state)
Sports venues completed in 1958